The Cape Canaveral Light is a historic lighthouse on the east coast of the U.S. state of Florida. The light was established in 1848 to warn ships of the dangerous shoals that lie off its coast.  It is located inside the Cape Canaveral Space Force Station and managed by the Space Launch Delta 45 of the U.S. Space Force with the assistance of the Cape Canaveral Lighthouse Foundation.  It is the only fully operational lighthouse owned by the United States Space Force.

The current  lighthouse tower was first erected and lit in 1868 then relocated further inland between 1893-1894.  It was originally equipped with a first-order Fresnel lens that was automated in 1967 and then retired from the tower in 1993.

History
The Cape Canaveral lighthouse was erected to warn mariners of the outlying shoals off its coast. Hetzel Shoal is located about  NE of the lighthouse and Ohio Shoals about  southward of Hetzel. In a heavy sea these shoals are marked by breakers, but with smooth sea there is nothing to indicate their locality. The land is usually not visible from off these outer shoals.

First lighthouse
The current Cape Canaveral Light is not the first lighthouse constructed on Cape Canaveral. On May 21, 1838, the building of the first lighthouse at the cape was requested by Florida territorial delegate Charles Downing. Nathaniel Scobie was appointed as the first lighthouse keeper and oversaw the construction of the lighthouse. Its light consisted of 15 Lewis lamps powered by whale oil, each with a 21-inch (530 mm) reflector. The lamps were set on a chandelier rotated via clockwork.

During the Seminole War scare, Scobie abandoned the lighthouse, and refused to return to his post.  Captain Mills Olcott Burnham (b. September 8, 1817) was appointed as the next lighthouse keeper in July 1853.  Along with his position, Burnham was given  of land as part of the Florida Armed Occupation Act of 1842, a legislation passed to populate the state.

Sailors heavily criticized the white brick lighthouse with complaints that the light was too weak and too low to be seen before ships were on the reefs near the cape.

Second lighthouse
In 1860, the government approved the construction of a new lighthouse.  However, the start of the American Civil War stopped the work on the new tower.  The lamps and mechanism of the lighthouse were removed from the tower by Burnham and buried in his orange grove to protect them from Federal raids.

At the end of the war, construction resumed on the lighthouse. The chosen replacement tower was made with cast iron plate designed so that it can be disassembled and moved to a new location at a minimal cost, in case the encroaching sea started threatening the lighthouse. The conical tower was lined inside by bricks for stability and insulation. The new all-white lighthouse tower was completed in 1868, receiving a first-order Fresnel lens made by Henry-Lepaute and Company of Paris, France that was first lit on May 10, 1868.

The lower three levels of the tower served as the living quarters for the keepers and his assistants complete with kitchen, living room and bedrooms.  The tower was designed to withstand flooding from storm surges that accompany strong hurricanes by making the entrance to the tower on the third floor, accessible by an outdoor stairway (the ground level door was later added in the 1930s).  This was tested in 1871 when a strong storm submerged the station.  The lighthouse and its keepers survived but the lamp oil and their drinking water were spoiled by the flood.

The white lighthouse tower was changed to its signature three black bands and three white bands in 1873, with the lantern room remaining white.

Soon after, the iron tower became unbearable to the keepers under the Florida sun and humidity.  They built and stayed in makeshift dwellings on the grounds of the lighthouse rather than stay in the oven-like tower.  In 1876, funds in the amount of $12,000 were appropriated to construct permanent dwellings for the keepers.

Relocating the lighthouse
By the 1880s, shoreline erosion was feared to be threatening the lighthouse, and the United States Congress appropriated funds to move the lighthouse inland. Initial work to move the tower was started in October 1893. A temporary  square black skeletal pyramidal lighthouse was erected to keep that section of the sea lit during the move.

The old tower (1848), which stood next to the new tower for about two decades, was blown up and the rubble was used to prepare a foundation for the lighthouse at the new location.  The cast iron tower was dismantled, moved by a tram pulled by mules, and reassembled at the new location about a mile westward together with the keepers' houses. The move took nine months, and the lighthouse was relit at its new location on July 25, 1894.  The 1900 Atlantic List of Lights indicated the color of the lantern room, which was probably painted during the move, as black.

William H. Peck wrote about his meeting with lighthouse keeper Mills Burnham of Cape Canaveral in the Florida Star newspaper in 1887.

In 1931, the mechanical clockwork of the tower that was turned by descending weights and needed winding every hour or two was modernized and replaced by an electric motor.

Transition into a military facility
President Harry S. Truman signed the legislation titled Public Law 60 on May 11, 1949 that established Cape Canaveral as the Joint Long Range Proving Ground, a site for missile testing by the military.  By this time, several small communities had developed in Cape Canaveral, two of which lies near the lighthouse: De Soto Beach to its north, which was located in the vicinity of Launch Complex 36 and Stinkmore to the south, located near Launch Complexes 17 and 5.  When rockets began launching from the Cape in the early 1950s, all its residents, except the lighthouse keepers, were relocated to other areas. In 1960, the need for a keeper to live nearby was eliminated with the automation of the light.  The keeper's homes were later demolished leaving only the brick oil house in the vicinity of the lighthouse.

After it was discovered that strong vibrations that accompany launches were loosening the prisms of the first-order Fresnel lens, it was finally removed in 1993 and sent to the lighthouse museum of the Ponce de Leon Inlet Light for restoration and display.

Ownership of the lighthouse was transferred by the Coast Guard to the United States Air Force on December 14, 2000.  In 2002, the Cape Canaveral Lighthouse Foundation was formed and a memorandum of agreement was signed with the USAF.

Head lighthouse keepers
The following is the list of head lighthouse keepers that served the station: 
 Nathaniel C. Scobie 1848 – 1850
 Ora Carpenter 1850 – 1853
 Mills O. Burnham 1853 – 1886
 George M. Quarterman 1886 – 1887
 James M. Knight 1887 – 1893
 John L. Stuck 1893 – 1904
 Clinton P. Honeywell 1904 – 1930
 Oscar F. Quarterman 1930 – 1939
 A. Davis 1939 – at least 1941

Restoration

Since toxic lead paint was used to paint the lighthouse, a restoration project from 1995-1996 sandblasted the harmful paint off.  The original copper lantern was also replaced with a galvanized steel lantern and was made into a lighthouse gazebo at the grounds of the Air Force Space and Missile Museum at Launch Complex 26 inside the Cape Canaveral Space Force Station.  A plaque mounted on a podium made from bricks of the 1848 lighthouse, was built to commemorate its dedication in October 1997.

In 2003, the oil house located in front of the ground floor door was restored to its original (1890s) state.  Strong winds had damaged the roof in the 1970s.  A window that was added to the brick structure in the early 1900s was also covered up during restoration.

During the 2006-2007 project, the structure was repainted using modern materials. The original copper lantern was repaired and restored to the lighthouse. The displaced galvanized steel lantern took its place at the lighthouse gazebo leaving just the original copper vent ball on its top.

The lighthouse today
The lighthouse is open to public visitors and previously was a part of the Air Force Space and Missile Museum public tour. However, as of 2013 due to sequestration the Space Launch Delta 45 no longer offers a tour of the area. Currently, those seeking to visit the lighthouse, and nearby museum should book touring by the Cape Canaveral Lighthouse Foundation. Visitors may only ascend to the fifth floor of the lighthouse as the remaining floors have been deemed as a safety liability by the Space Force and require special access to ascend.

The Cape Canaveral Lighthouse Foundation and volunteers are instrumental in the restoration projects and in interpreting the lighthouse history.  Future plans of the foundation includes the restoration of the three keeper's cottages for multipurpose use.

See also

 List of lighthouses in Florida
 List of lighthouses in the United States

References

External links 

 Air Force Space & Missile Museum for information about tours to the lighthouse
 Cape Canaveral Lighthouse Foundation  
 Historic lighthouse photos from Spaceline
 

Transportation buildings and structures in Brevard County, Florida
Cape Canaveral Space Force Station
History of Brevard County, Florida
Lighthouses completed in 1848
Lighthouses completed in 1868
Lighthouses in Florida
Relocated buildings and structures in Florida
Tourist attractions in Brevard County, Florida
1848 establishments in Florida